Richard Lionel Martin (July 26, 1951March 13, 2011) was a Canadian professional ice hockey winger who played in the NHL with the Buffalo Sabres and Los Angeles Kings for 11 seasons between 1971 and 1982. He featured in the 1975 Stanley Cup Finals with the Sabres. He was most famous for playing on the Sabres' French Connection line with Gilbert Perreault and Rene Robert.

Playing career
Martin was drafted fifth overall by the Buffalo Sabres in the 1971 NHL Amateur Draft after a junior career with the Montreal Junior Canadiens of the Ontario Hockey Association (OHA). He played 685 career NHL games, scoring 384 goals and 317 assists for 701 points. His best season was the 1974–75 NHL season when he scored 52 goals and 95 points in only 68 games. Martin scored at least 44 goals five times in his NHL career. Martin was selected to play in seven consecutive National Hockey League All-Star Games (1971–72, through 1977–78) and was selected as the official NHL All-Star first team left wing in 1973–74 and 1974–75 and the official NHL All-Star second team left wing in 1975–76 and 1976–77. Martin holds the Buffalo Sabres franchise career records for hat tricks, four-goal games, 40-goal seasons, consecutive 40-goal seasons, 50-goal seasons (tied with Danny Gare), consecutive 50-goal seasons. Martin is also #11 all-time in career goals per game average (.56) in NHL regular-season history.

Martin was involved in probably one of the three most frightening injuries on Buffalo home ice (the others being when Clint Malarchuk's and Richard Zednik's in separate incidents each had their jugular vein lacerated). Midway through the third period of the Sabres' 2-0 home win on February 9, 1978, Dave Farrish of the New York Rangers hooked Martin around the neck from behind and kicked Martin's feet out from under him, causing Martin to hit his head on the ice. He was knocked unconscious, and went into convulsions. After that play, helmets became a much more common sight on the heads of his Sabre teammates.

On November 8, 1980, Martin's career was dealt a devastating blow. In a game against the Washington Capitals at the Aud, Martin was racing in on a breakaway. Capitals forward Ryan Walter managed to trip Martin and no penalty was called. Capitals goalie Mike Palmateer, already way out of his crease, knocked Martin back down by kicking his knee, causing severe cartilage damage that all but ended Martin's career.

Martin underwent surgery in Toronto and on March 10, 1981, Scotty Bowman traded Martin and Don Luce to the Kings for a pair of draft picks, one of which the Sabres used to get goalie Tom Barrasso in 1983. Martin played four games for the Los Angeles Kings before hanging up the skates. In 1989 he, along with the other two members of the French Connection, were inducted into the Buffalo Sabres Hall of Fame. His number 7 was retired along with Rene Robert's #14 on November 15, 1995, flanking the #11 of Gilbert Perreault under a French Connection banner. On Oct. 25, 2005, Martin was inducted into the Greater Buffalo Sports Hall of Fame. In 2010, in commemoration of the Sabres' 40th season, The Buffalo News ranked Martin number 4 out of the top 40 Sabres of all time, while he was voted #5 by fans.  After his death in 2011, the Sabres honored his memory by painting the number 7, the number Martin wore for most of his career with Buffalo, behind each goal at the HSBC Arena for the remainder of the 2010-11 season.

In 2012, a statue of "The French Connection" was unveiled in front of the Sabres' arena, today known as KeyBank Center.

Achievements
1st Team All Star (1973–74)
1st Team All Star (1974–75)
2nd Team All Star (1975–76)
2nd Team All Star (1976–77)
7 Straight NHL All Star Game Appearances (1972–1978)
3rd All Time in Hat Tricks (21) among Left Wingers (Modern Era)
11th All Time in Career Goals Per Game Average in NHL History
Gold Championship Canada Cup 1976 (Team Canada)
5 "Top 10" finishes in Goals
2 "Top 10" finishes in Points
5 "Top 10" finishes in Even Strength Goals
3 "Top 10" finishes in Game Winning Goals
5 "Top 10" finishes in Power Play Goals
5 "Top 10" finishes in Goals Per Game Average
2 "Top 10" finishes in Points Per Game Average
6 Team Scoring Records (Buffalo Sabres)
 #7 Team Jersey Retired (Buffalo Sabres)
Buffalo Sabres Hall Of Famer

Personal life
Rick and his wife were owners of Globalquest Solutions and Globalquest Staffing Solutions in Williamsville, New York.

Martin owned a bar/restaurant called Slapshot on Niagara Falls Boulevard in Niagara Falls, N.Y.

Rick Martin died on March 13, 2011, in Clarence, New York, from a heart attack while driving, a complication of hypertensive arteriosclerotic cardiovascular disease. He was 59 years old. He was survived by his wife Mikey, who has since died on December 16, 2017, and his sons Cory, Josh, and Erick. Later analysis revealed that Martin had stage 2 chronic traumatic encephalopathy, a disease normally associated with enforcers; the damage was believed to stem from a severe concussion Martin sustained in 1978, and it had no effect on his cognitive abilities. Martin is the first non-enforcer to have been diagnosed with the disease, which can only be diagnosed posthumously.

Career statistics

Regular season and playoffs

International

References

External links

Mikey Martin, Rick Martin's Wife

1951 births
2011 deaths
Buffalo Sabres draft picks
Buffalo Sabres players
Canadian ice hockey left wingers
Ice hockey people from Montreal
Ice hockey players with chronic traumatic encephalopathy
Los Angeles Kings players
Moncton Golden Flames players
Montreal Junior Canadiens players
National Hockey League first-round draft picks
National Hockey League players with retired numbers
People from Verdun, Quebec